Banc y Mwldan is a Site of Special Scientific Interest in Ceredigion,  west Wales.

References

See also
List of Sites of Special Scientific Interest in Ceredigion

Sites of Special Scientific Interest in Ceredigion